Teeth cleaning is part of oral hygiene and involves the removal of dental plaque from teeth with the intention of preventing cavities (dental caries), gingivitis, and periodontal disease. People routinely clean their own teeth by brushing and interdental cleaning, and dental hygienists can remove hardened deposits (tartar) not removed by routine cleaning.  Those with dentures and natural teeth may supplement their cleaning with a denture cleaner.

Brushing, scrubbing and flossing

Brushing 
Careful and frequent brushing with a toothbrush helps to prevent build-up of plaque bacteria on the teeth.
Electric toothbrushes were developed, and initially recommended for people with strength or dexterity problems in their hands, but they have come into widespread general use. The effectiveness of electric toothbrushes at reducing plaque formation and gingivitis is superior to conventional manual toothbrushes.

How to Brush

Ensuring effective brushing is important in getting rid of food and bacteria properly. 

Step 1) Place a pea sized amount of toothpaste on the brush and hold at a 45 degree angle.

Step 2) In small circular and back and forth motions, move the brush gently along teeth and gums.

Step 3) Brush all surfaces inside the mouth, including the tongue. Ensure that the back sides of the teeth (top and bottom rows) are being cleaned by brushing vertically in up and down motions.

Flossing 
In addition to brushing, cleaning between teeth may help to prevent build-up of plaque bacteria on the teeth. This may be done with dental floss or interdental brushes.

80% of cavities occur in the grooves, or pits and fissures, of the chewing surfaces of the teeth, however, there is no evidence currently showing that normal at-home flossing reduces the risk of cavities in these areas.
  
Special appliances or tools may be used to supplement toothbrushing and interdental cleaning. These include special toothpicks, oral irrigators, and other devices. A 2015 Cochrane review found insufficient evidence to determine whether the interdental brushing decreases the levels of plaque when compared to flossing.

Professional teeth cleaning 

Teeth cleaning (also known as prophylaxis, literally a preventive treatment of a disease) is a procedure for the removal of tartar (mineralized plaque) that may develop even with careful brushing and flossing, especially in areas that are difficult to reach in routine toothbrushing. It is often done by a dental hygienist. Professional cleaning includes tooth scaling, tooth polishing, and debridement if too much tartar has accumulated. This involves the use of various instruments or devices to loosen and remove deposits from the teeth. The American Dental Association has designated the code D1110 for adult prophylaxis or dental cleaning and has also designated the code D1120 for the same procedure in children.

As to the frequency of cleaning, research on this matter is inconclusive. That is, it has neither been shown that more frequent cleaning leads to better outcomes nor that it does not. A review of the research literature on the question concluded "[t]he research evidence is not of sufficient quality to reach any conclusions regarding the beneficial and adverse effects of routine scaling and polishing for periodontal health and regarding the effects of providing this intervention at different time intervals". Thus, any general recommendation for a frequency of routine cleaning (e.g. every six months, every year) has no empirical basis.

Complications 

Overly vigorous or incorrectly performed brushing or flossing may cause injury to the gingiva (gums). Improper or over-vigorous brushing may cause sore gums, damage to tooth enamel, gingivitis, and bleeding gums. Dentists and dental hygienists can instruct and demonstrate proper brushing or flossing techniques.

Aerosols generated during dental cleaning procedures may spread infection. During the COVID-19 pandemic on 12 August 2020, the World Health Organization recommended that routine dental checkups be delayed in areas of community transmission. Characteristics and detection rate of SARS-CoV-2 in alternative sites and specimens related to dentistry has been extensively reviewed.

Disinfection 

Antiseptics are recommended.

Acidity regulation 

Soda.

History
Historically, professional tooth cleaning was sometimes referred to as odontexesis (literally "tooth-scraping") or odontexis ("scraping off"), and the instruments involved odontoglyphs.

References

External links 
World Health Organization site on oral health

Dentistry procedures
Oral hygiene

ru:Чистка зубов
sv:Tandhygien